Rolland Fairley (7 December 1904 – 10 June 1930) was an Australian rules footballer who played with South Melbourne and Hawthorn in the Victorian Football League (VFL).

Born in Shepparton to John Frederick Fairley and Helen Georgina McCracken, Rolland Fairley was educated at Shepparton High School.

Arriving from South Melbourne Districts, Fairley played eight games for South Melbourne in the 1927 VFL season. He appeared two more times for the club in 1928 but finished the season at Hawthorn, playing 12 games. All his appearance with Hawthorn were losses.

He returned to country football with Shepparton in 1929.

Fairley was killed in a road accident at Wallan in 1930, en route to Shepparton. He had been changing a tyre on the side of the road when he was struck by another vehicle.

References

1904 births
Australian rules footballers from Victoria (Australia)
Sydney Swans players
Hawthorn Football Club players
Shepparton Football Club players
Road incident deaths in Victoria (Australia)
Pedestrian road incident deaths
1930 deaths
People educated at Geelong College